Biowaste may refer to:
 Biodegradable waste
 Food waste
 Human waste
Green waste
Brown waste

 Biomedical waste